O.F. Ierapetra Football Club, short for Omilos Filathlon Ierapetra (translated: Ierapetra fans' club) and also simply known as OFI ( − not to be confused with OFI Crete based in Heraklion, whose acronym is spelled differently in Greek), is a Greek professional football club based in Ierapetra, Lasithi, Crete, Greece. The club was established in 1970, and its traditional colors are black and white. It is the oldest and most successful football club representing the town of Ierapetra, hometown of one of the greatest Cretan players of all time: Petros Vouzounerakis, of whom the club's home ground is named after (Ierapetra Municipal Stadium «Petros Vouzounerakis»). The club currently competes in the Super League 2, the second tier of the Greek football league system.

History 
O.F. Ierapetra was founded in 1970 as a result of a merger between Thyella and Diagoras, the two clubs based in the town at the time. Throughout the 70s, O.F. Ierapetra played in the Pan-Hellenic Amateur Championship, which used to be the unofficial third tier of the Greek football league system. During the following decades, the club had a significant presence in the Delta Ethniki (4th level in the national league pyramid) of which they earned promotion to the Gamma Ethniki in 2006 after winning the Cretan Group championship title. For their first ever season in the Gamma Ethniki, the club failed to avoid relegation, largely due to inexperience, despite some memorable winning results against historic clubs such as Panachaiki.

In 2017, the club once again achieved promotion to the Gamma Ethniki after winning the Lasithi regional championship, where it still competes.

Crest and colours 
At the start of 2010−11 season, O.F. Ierapetra merged with the other two clubs representing the town of Ierapetra, Anagennisi and A.S. Ierapetra thus forming Ierapetra F.C. However at the end of the season, the merger broke up.

Players

Current squad

Honours

National competitions

League titles 
 Third Division
 Winners (1): 2018–19
 Fourth Division
 Winners (1): 2005–06
 Lasithi FCA Championship (Local Championship)
 Winners (11): 1985–86, 1987–88, 1993–94, 1999–2000, 2000–01, 2009–10, 2010–11 (as I.F.C.), 2011–12, 2014–15, 2015–16, 2016–17

Cups 
 Greek Amateur Cup
 Winners (1): 2017–18
 Lasithi FCA Cup (Local Cup)
 Winners (11): 1990–91, 1999–2000, 2000–01, 2005–06, 2007–08, 2009–10, 2013–14, 2014–15, 2015–16, 2016–17, 2017–18

References

External links 
 O.F. Ierapetra official blog

 
Football clubs in Lasithi
Football clubs in Crete
Association football clubs established in 1970
1970 establishments in Greece
Ierapetra
Super League Greece 2 clubs